God Is in the TV is an independent music and culture online magazine founded by editor Bill Cummings in Cardiff in 2003. It publishes independent music reviews, features, interviews, podcasts and media. The webzine's coverage varies from unsigned and independent artists to major-label releases.

Album reviews by God Is in the TV are used on review aggregator sites AnyDecentMusic? and Album of the Year. Interviews and reviews by the webzine have been cited by publications such as The Guardian, NME, Drowned in Sound, and Gigwise. The webzine has released a series of free downloads, and in November 2006 released a compilation album, God Is in the CD. Writers from God Is in the TV have appeared on BBC Radio 6 Music, and been shortlisted or won awards at the BT Digital Music Awards and The Association of Independent Festivals.

References

External links 

Internet properties established in 2003
British music websites
Online music magazines published in the United Kingdom
British record labels
British review websites
Music review websites